Tomás Couve Correa (born 30 June 1972) is a Chilean equestrian. He competed in two events at the 2012 Summer Olympics.

References

1972 births
Living people
Chilean male equestrians
Olympic equestrians of Chile
Equestrians at the 2012 Summer Olympics
Equestrians at the 2011 Pan American Games
Sportspeople from Santiago
Pan American Games competitors for Chile
21st-century Chilean people